Lee Han-sin (Hangul: 이한신; born February 27, 1988, in Jinan, Jeollabuk-do) is a South Korean skeleton racer. He is a participant at the 2014 Winter Olympics in Sochi.

References

External links
 

1988 births
Skeleton racers at the 2014 Winter Olympics
Living people
Olympic skeleton racers of South Korea
South Korean male skeleton racers
Sportspeople from North Jeolla Province
20th-century South Korean people
21st-century South Korean people